The Nika Award for Discovery of the Year is given annually by the Russian Academy of Cinema Arts and Science and presented at the Nika Awards.

In the following lists, the titles and names in bold with a light blue background are the winners and recipients respectively; those not in bold are the nominees.

Winners and nominees

2000s

2010s

2020s

References

External links
 

Nika Awards
Directorial debut film awards
Lists of films by award